KTR may refer to:
 KTR, a Belgian auto racing team owned by Kurt Mollekens
 Confederation of Labour of Russia
 Cretaceous Terrestrial Revolution
 Keio Corporation or Keio Teito Electric Railway, Tokyo, Japan
 Kitakinki Tango Railway, Japan
 KTR, station code for Kesteren railway station in Neder-Betuwe, Netherlands
 KTR, station code for Kingstree (Amtrak station), South Carolina, US
 KTR, IATA code for RAAF Base Tindal, Katherine, Northern Territory, Australia
 Korea Testing & Research Institute
 K. T. Rama Rao, Indian politician